Fornasari Hunter is a sport utility vehicle made by Italian company Fornasari.

It is available in two customization options: racetrack (GP suspension and brakes, carbon fiber body and slick tires) and desert (Dakar suspension, aluminium body, offroad tyres). It is one of the few cars available in any color scheme. It has a molybdenum-chrome alloy frame. It is available with a choice of a V6 and four V8s, all from General Motors.

References

Sport utility vehicles